Nine is a 2009 romantic musical drama film directed and produced by Rob Marshall and written by Michael Tolkin and Anthony Minghella. The film is an adaptation of the 1982 musical of the same name, which in turn is based on Federico Fellini's semi-autobiographical 1963 film 8½. In addition to songs from the stage musical, all written by Maury Yeston, the film has three original songs, also written by Yeston. The ensemble cast consists of Daniel Day-Lewis, Marion Cotillard, Penélope Cruz, Judi Dench, Fergie, Kate Hudson, Nicole Kidman, and Sophia Loren.

The film premiered in London, opened the 6th annual Dubai International Film Festival on December 9, 2009 and was released in the United States on December 18, 2009, in New York City and Los Angeles, with a wide release on December 25, 2009. Though a critical and commercial failure, Nine was nominated for four Academy Awards: Best Supporting Actress (Penélope Cruz), Best Art Direction (John Myhre (AD), Gordon Sim (SD)), Best Costume Design (Colleen Atwood), and Best Original Song ("Take It All", music and lyrics by Maury Yeston).

Plot 
In 1965, Guido Contini is a gifted Italian filmmaker at the famous Cinecittà movie studios in Rome. Having turned fifty and developed writer's block, he conjures all the women in his life, both alive and deceased, for inspiration, including: Luisa (née Acari), his wife; Claudia Jenssen, his star actress; Carla Albanese, his mistress; Liliane "Lilli" La Fleur, his costume designer and confidant; Stephanie Necrophorus, an American fashion journalist from Vogue; Saraghina, a prostitute from his childhood; and his beloved Mamma ("Overture Delle Donne").

Having not yet formulated an idea for his new movie, Guido evades questions from reporters. In his mind, he wishes for both youthful naiveté and the wisdom of age ("Guido's Song"). Escaping to the Bellavista Spa Hotel on the coast, he receives a seductive call from Carla while a doctor examines him ("A Call from the Vatican"). She comes to stay with him, but he hides her in a shabby pensione instead.

Dante, Guido's producer, brings much of the film's crew to work at the hotel. When Guido confesses to Lilli his dilemma, she urges him to use his film to entertain, inspired by the Folies Bergère where she "learnt her art" ("Folies Bergères"). Guido remembers Saraghina, a prostitute whom he and his schoolmates paid to teach them the joy of life's sensual pleasures (the art of love and sex) by dancing for them on a beach when he was nine years old ("Be Italian"), before he was caught by the priests and whipped.

At dinner, Guido is surprised to see Luisa, who recounts having abandoned her acting career to be his wife ("My Husband Makes Movies").  Carla arrives, and Luisa storms out; Guido orders Carla back to the pensione alone, leaving her heartbroken. Failing to pacify Luisa, Guido meets Stephanie in the hotel's bar, who confesses that she adores his movies’ style rather than their substance ("Cinema Italiano"). Stephanie takes Guido to her room but, while watching her undress, he realizes he still cares for his wife.

Returning to Luisa, he promises to discontinue cheating. As she embraces him, he is called away to help Carla, who has overdosed on pills in a suicide attempt. Guido stays with Carla, and has a vision of his mother singing him a lullaby when he was young ("Guarda La Luna"), advising him to repair his life. He leaves when Carla's husband Luigi arrives in the morning, and returns to find Luisa gone, while the film crew leaves for Rome.

Filming in Rome, Guido phones Luisa to come that evening. When his leading lady, Claudia, senses there is no script, Guido confesses that he needs her to inspire one. His idea for the film resembles his own ordeal: a man lost and in love with so many women. Claudia responds that this man is incapable of love and that, while she loves him, she cannot keep playing the same part in his films or his life ("Unusual Way").

While Guido is reviewing screen tests, Luisa arrives and is devastated to see him interact with an actress exactly as when he first met Luisa. After an argument and an angry, imaginary striptease ("Take It All"), Luisa permanently leaves Guido. Finally acknowledging the truth, Guido cancels the film, now abandoned by all those he has selfishly been exploiting ("I Can’t Make This Movie"). He admits to the crew that there never was a movie to make, and has the set destroyed before he leaves Rome.

Two years later, at a café in Anguillara, Guido sees an advertisement for a play starring Luisa, whom he sees leave the theater with another man. Lilli suggests he make another movie, but Guido’s only idea is a man trying to win back his wife. Some time later, Guido is making that very film, directing actors representing a younger version of himself and Luisa, living in a small apartment and deeply in love. Guido's younger self assembles the cast of his entire life on the scaffolding behind him ("Finale"), as Luisa arrives and watches from the shadows, happy that Guido has returned to his former self. The younger Guido runs to sit on the elder Guido's lap as fantasy meets reality, and the mature Guido calls, “Action!”

Cast 
 Daniel Day-Lewis as Guido Contini - based on Federico Fellini.
 Giuseppe Spitaleri as young Guido Contini
 Marion Cotillard as Luisa Acari Contini, based on Giulietta Masina, Fellini's wife. 
 Penélope Cruz as Carla Albanese, based on Anna Giovannini, Fellini's mistress.
 Nicole Kidman as Claudia Jenssen, based on movie star Anita Ekberg. 
 Judi Dench as Liliane La Fleur, a costume designer.
 Kate Hudson as Stephanie Necrophorus, a Vogue fashion journalist.
 Sophia Loren as Mamma Contini, Guido's mother.
 Fergie as Saraghina, a prostitute.
 Ricky Tognazzi as Dante, Guido's producer.
 Giuseppe Cederna as Fausto
 Elio Germano as Pierpaolo
 Valerio Mastandrea as De Rossi
 Martina Stella as Donatella
 Roberto Citran as Dr. Rondi
 Andy Pessoa as Italian boy
 Max Procaccini as The Business Man
 John Terry as Marvin
 Vincent Riotta as Luigi

Production

Development 
On April 12, 2007, Variety announced Rob Marshall would direct a feature film adaptation of Nine for The Weinstein Company. Marshall had previously directed Chicago for the Weinsteins while they were still at Miramax. The film was co-produced by Marshall's own production company, Lucamar Productions. In 2008, a short "teaser" for the film was featured in an episode of the Food Network show, Barefoot Contessa, with the host, Ina Garten, making breakfast and lunch for her friends, producers John DeLuca and Rob Marshall, as they edited their new film, at the end being a "preview" of their film for the host to see in appreciation. In December 2009, the film contracted the soap operas One Life to Live and General Hospital for advertising purposes. The former featured two of the characters watching one of the film's trailers on the Internet on a YouTube-esque website, and there were subtle setting alterations performed for the latter, including movie posters on the walls of various public places.

Casting 
On April 4, 2008, it was reported that Nicole Kidman had replaced Catherine Zeta-Jones in the role of Claudia Jenssen, who turned down the role when director Marshall refused to expand the role for the film. The film was Kidman's first big-screen musical since Moulin Rouge! After Catherine Zeta-Jones's departure, Anne Hathaway auditioned for the role, but was turned down. On May 14, 2008, Variety reported Daniel Day-Lewis was in talks to star in the film as Guido Contini, the film's lead character, after Javier Bardem dropped out due to exhaustion. Later, it was reported Day-Lewis sent producers a video of him singing and shocked them with his voice. On May 19, 2008, People reported the actor had landed the role. Antonio Banderas, who had starred in the Broadway revival, said he was "disappointed" at not being cast, but that he thought the trailer to the film looked great and only wished the "best" for everyone involved. Marion Cotillard auditioned for the role of Lilli, but was cast as Luisa. On July 15, 2008, the Chicago Tribune reported that Kate Hudson had been cast in a role created specifically for her, which had not been featured in the Broadway show. On July 18, 2008, People reported Fergie had been cast as Saraghina. Katie Holmes and Demi Moore auditioned for unknown roles but neither was cast.

Filming 
Rehearsals for the film began in August 2008, the songs were recorded in late September, and filming commenced in October at Shepperton Studios, London. Further filming took place in Italy (in the villages of Anzio and Sutri), and at Cinecittà Film Studios. Nines schedule required Kidman to begin rehearsals just four weeks after giving birth to her daughter.

Day-Lewis already knew some Italian (although he admitted to not studying for the role at a Q&A session for the Screen Actors Guild), and he frequently spoke the language in and out of character. According to music supervisor Matt Sullivan, "One day during shooting at London's Shepperton Studios, Rob and I got called into Daniel's dressing room, which was designed as a 1960s film director's office...He's smoking a cigarette, in full outfit and in character, and he's telling us how he would like to see this number that he's performing. And he's talking to us as Guido Contini. It was a really surreal experience."

The teaser trailer for the film was released on May 14, 2009.

Music

Soundtrack

Track list 
      
(*) Songs not featured in the film, bonus tracks.

Original songs 
Variety confirmed that three new songs had been created for the film by original Broadway composer Maury Yeston and were not included in the original stage score. They were:
 "Guarda La Luna" (Look at the Moon), a lullaby sung by Sophia Loren as Mamma. Yeston tailored this song specifically for Loren's voice, though he based the melody on the song Waltz from Nine from the Broadway score.
 "Cinema Italiano", a number which Kate Hudson performs as Stephanie. This has "a retro feel" with "elements of '60s pop" that demonstrate how important Italian cinema was in that era and to illustrate the shallowness and vanity of Stephanie. 
 "Take It All", originally written as a trio for Claudia, Carla, and Luisa, but, just before shooting, rearranged as a solo for Luisa, according to music supervisor Matt Sullivan.

Removed songs 
These are songs that appeared in the musical, but were not included in the film nor in the soundtrack.
 "Not Since Chaplin", by Company
 "The Germans at the Spa", by Company
 "Not Since Chaplin - Reprise", by Company
 "Movie Themes", by Guido
 "Only with You", by Guido
 "The Script", by Guido
 "Nine", by Mamma
 "Ti Voglio Bene", by Saraghina
 "The Bells of St. Sebastian", by Guido, Little Guido and Company
 "A Man Like You", by Guido and Claudia
 "Unusual Way - Duet", by Guido and Claudia
 "Contini Submits", by Guido
 "The Grand Canal" (Every Girl in Venice/Amor/Only You/Finale), by Guido, Claudia, Lilli, Luisa, Stephanie, Carla, Mamma, Company
 "Simple", by Carla
 "Be on Your Own", by Luisa
 "Not Since Chaplin - Reprise", by Company
 "Getting Tall", by Little Guido
 "Long Ago - Reprise/Nine - Reprise", by Guido, Little Guido and Luisa

Chart performance 
The film soundtrack peaked at number twenty-six on the Billboard 200. It also peaked at number three on the Polish Albums Chart and at number nine on the Greek Albums Chart.

Reception 
Nine received generally mixed-to-negative reviews, although the performances of the cast were praised by critics. , the film holds a 39% approval rating on review aggregate Rotten Tomatoes based on 208 reviews, with an average rating of 5.20/10. The critical consensus is: "It has a game, great-looking cast, led by the always worthwhile Daniel Day-Lewis, but Rob Marshall's Nine is chaotic and curiously distant." On Metacritic, the film has an average rating of 49/100 from 33 reviews, indicating "mixed or average reviews". The film was also a box office bomb, as it grossed just $19 million domestically and just below $54 million worldwide, against an $80 million budget. Despite this less than favorable reception, it received four nominations for the 82nd Academy Awards and received other notable nominations and awards.

In a 2018 interview with The New Yorker, Rob Marshall revealed that he believes the Weinstein Company failed to market the film properly as it was a trickier sell than Chicago and should have started in festivals and smaller venues. He also said, “I did feel somewhat compromised working on it. Everything on the screen wasn’t fully my perfect version of it.”

Awards

Home media 
Nine was released on DVD and Blu-ray May 4, 2010. The DVD featured an audio commentary by director Rob Marshall and producer John DeLuca, 8 featurettes, and 3 music videos. The Blu-ray Disc included all the DVD extras including another featurette and a Screen Actors Guild Q&A.

References

External links 
 
 
 
 
 
 

2009 films
2009 romantic drama films
2000s musical drama films
American musical drama films
American romantic drama films
American romantic musical films
Films directed by Rob Marshall
American black-and-white films
Italian black-and-white films
Films about film directors and producers
American remakes of Italian films
Adaptations of works by Federico Fellini
Italian films based on plays
American films based on plays
Films based on musicals based on films
Films about music and musicians
Films set in Italy
Films set in 1965
Films shot in Rome
Relativity Media films
The Weinstein Company films
Films produced by Marc E. Platt
Films produced by Harvey Weinstein
Films with screenplays by Michael Tolkin
Films based on musicals
Films produced by John DeLuca
Films produced by Rob Marshall
2000s English-language films
2000s American films